"Starchild" is a song written by Wally Badarou, Mark King and Phil Gould. It was released in 1981 as part of the British pop band Level 42's debut studio album. The song was released as single in the same year. It peaked at #47 on the UK Singles Chart and entered the American Club Play Singles chart at #60.  It was Level 42's fifth single and was the band's first song to enter the Club Play Singles.
It was also sampled for the remix of The Bucketheads' "Time and Space".

The single has been released in six countries beyond the United Kingdom, including Ireland, the United States and Germany. In 2001, it was re-released by the label Peppermint Jam Records in the United Kingdom and Germany.

Charts

References

1981 singles
Level 42 songs
Songs written by Mark King (musician)
1981 songs
Songs written by Wally Badarou
Songs written by Phil Gould (musician)
Polydor Records singles
Song recordings produced by Mike Vernon (record producer)